Roualeyn Robert Hovell-Thurlow-Cumming-Bruce, 9th Baron Thurlow (born 13 April 1952), is a British hereditary peer and chartered surveyor who sits as a crossbench member of the House of Lords.

He was elected to sit in the House at a crossbench hereditary peers' by-election in February 2015, following the resignation of Lord Chorley.

He married Bridget Anne Julia Ismay Cheape on 5 May 1980, the daughter of Hugh Bruce Ismay Cheape, of Fossoway Lodge, Kinross. They have four children:

The Hon. Nicholas Edward Hovell-Thurlow-Cumming-Bruce (b. 1986);
The Hon. Iona Tessa Bridget Hovell-Thurlow-Cumming-Bruce (b. 1987);
The Hon. George Patrick Roualeyn Hovell-Thurlow-Cumming-Bruce (b. 1990);
The Hon. Lorna Belinda Hovell-Thurlow-Cumming-Bruce (b. 1991).

His ancestors include Mary Catherine Bolton (1791–1840), a notable actress, and her husband, Edward Hovell-Thurlow, 2nd Baron Thurlow (1781–1829), a minor poet.

References

External links
Lord Thurlow profile at parliament.uk

1952 births
Living people
Crossbench hereditary peers
Roualeyn
Roualeyn

Hereditary peers elected under the House of Lords Act 1999